Acid Rap is the second mixtape by American rapper Chance the Rapper. It was released on April 30, 2013, as a free digital download. In July 2013, the album debuted at number 63 on the Billboard Top R&B/Hip-Hop Albums, due to bootleg downloads on iTunes and Amazon not affiliated with the artist. The mixtape has been certified "diamond" on mixtape site Datpiff, for garnering over 1,000,000 downloads. It was rereleased on streaming services on June 21, 2019, alongside his 2012 mixtape 10 Day.

Background and production

Use of LSD 
Chancellor Bennett has admitted that some LSD was used during the production of this mixtape. Bennett has said, "[There] was a lot of acid involved in Acid Rap. I mean, it wasn't too much — I'd say it was about 30 to 40 percent acid... more so 30 percent acid." He has also made it clear that LSD's involvement was just a small factor in the making of the mixtape. Bennett has said that, "It wasn't the biggest component at all. It was something that I was really interested in for a long time during the making of the tape, but it's not necessarily a huge factor at all. It was more so just a booster, a bit of fuel. It's an allegory to acid, more so than just a tape about acid."

Cover art 
The cover art for Acid Rap was based on a real picture taken at South by Southwest, an annual conglomerate of film, interactive media, and music festivals and conferences that take place in mid-March in Austin, Texas. The picture was taken by Brandon Breaux, who also designed the cover art for Bennett's previous mixtape 10 Day. The picture happened by chance, according to Beaux, "I had made these Tie Dye tank tops before we went to SXSW and I gave them to Chance… In the back of my mind I'm like I hope you wear this."

Production 
Bennett used artists and producers from Chicago who he had also worked with before. The acid jazz sound of the mixtape can be attributed to the collaboration of artists and producers from multiple genres. Bennett has said, "People that I worked with on other projects from multiple genres just came together to make a dope tape." Bennett attributes most of the funky or jazz sound to Peter Cottontale saying, "Peter Cottontale is a really sick jazz pianist."

Bennett describes Acid Rap as more of a music based album and less of a story-based album when compared to his previous mixtape. When asked to compare 10 Day to Acid Rap Bennett said, "Acid Rap is just a whole different monster; it's me as an adult making great music instead of a kid trying to explain a story. It's less of a conceptual project. It's still very cohesive, storytelling-wise, and its own project. But it's more music-based than story-based this time. I'm still telling the story of what it's like coming out of high school, not going to college and my experience with LSD. The new music that I started listening to has got a really heavy Acid Jazz base to it. It's just really good songs; it's a collection of great songs, which is exactly what #10Day is. But it's more of just a really good album than a story."

Release 
Acid Rap was released as a mixtape and not an album. Bennett said, "One of my biggest talents is performing live. " This gave him the idea to make his money by selling merchandise and performing live. Along with these reasons, he also chose to release his music as a mixtape because he wanted to create free music. More recently he has also rapped about his hatred for record labels in one of his more recent songs, "No Problem". Bennett being unsigned also gave him the ability to collaborate with any artists of his choosing. Collaboration was a main factor in the production of Acid Rap and that is another reason why Bennett decided to remain unsigned.

On June 28, 2019, Bennett officially released the mixtape onto streaming services along with his prior mixtape 10 Day. The track "Juice" didn't have its sample cleared and is instead replaced by a 30-second voice memo by Bennett.

Reception 

Acid Rap was met with widespread critical acclaim. At Metacritic, which assigns a normalized rating out of 100 to reviews from mainstream publications, the mixtape received an average score of 86, based on 21 reviews. It was also nominated for Best Mixtape at the 2013 BET Hip Hop Awards. The mixtape was ranked at number two on Spins list and number 26 on Rolling Stones list of the 50 best albums of 2013, and first on their list of best mixtapes of 2013. It was the second most downloaded mixtape on MixtapeMonkey.com. It was also ranked at number 12 on Pitchforks Top 50 Albums of 2013.

President Barack Obama added the song "Acid Rain" to his summer 2016 playlist.

In 2019, Pitchfork listed it 84 on its top 200 albums of the decade.

Track listing 
Credits adapted from Tidal and the album's vinyl liner notes, and reflect the 2019 re-release.

Notes
 "Paranoia" was included as a hidden track following "Pusha Man" for the original mixtape release, with Nosaj Thing's contributions receiving no credit. The twenty eight seconds of silence that separated the two tracks is omitted entirely on the streaming and vinyl releases.
 "Juice" is replaced by a 30-second voice memo for the streaming re-release and is omitted entirely on the vinyl release.

Samples
 "Good Ass Intro" contains a sample of "Intro", written by Kanye West; and embodies portions of "Faithful", written by Lonnie Lynn, John Stephens, Dewayne Julius Rogers Sr. and West.
 "Pusha Man" contains a sample and embodies portions of "Modaji", performed and written by Dave Grusin; and contains an interpolation of "Pusherman", written by Curtis Mayfield.
 "Lost" contains a sample and embodies portions of "Brother's Gonna Work It Out", performed and written by Willie Hutch.
 "Everybody's Something" contains an interpolation of "Diana in the Autumn Wind", written by Roger Kay Karshner and Chuck Mangione; and contains a sample and embodies portions of "Fall in Love", performed by Slum Village and written by James Yancey, R.L. Altman and Titus Glover.
 "Favorite Song" contains samples and embodies portions of "Clean Up Woman", performed by Betty Wright and written by Willie Clarke and Clarence Reid.
 "NaNa" contains samples from "Red Clay", written by Freddie Hubbard and performed by Jack Wilkins.
 "Chain Smoker" contains samples from "Long Red (Live)", written by Felix Pappalardi, John Ventura, Leslie Weinstein and Norman Landsberg.

Production personnel 
Brandon Breaux — artwork
OJ Hays — "Acid Rap" typeface
Elton "L10mixedit" Chueng — engineering, mixing, mastering
Na'el Shehade — Engineer, Producer 
Alex "PapiBeatz" Baez — engineering
Andrew Barber – Founder of Fake Shore Drive
Su$h! Ceej — Member of Two-9, producer ("Pusha Man")
Peter CottonTale — Music Director, Producer ("Good Ass Intro," "Cocoa Butter Kisses")
brandUn DeShay (Ace Hashimoto) — Producer ("NaNa")
J.P. Floyd — Trombonist, featured artist ("Good Ass Intro")
Nate Fox — Member of the Social Experiment, featured artist ("Pusha Man"), producer ("Juice," "Lost," "Favorite Song," "Chain Smoker")
Alex Fruchter — Founder of Closed Sessions
Rich Gains – Member of Blended Babies, producer ("Smoke Again")
Ludwig Göransson – Producer ("Interlude [That's Love]")
JP – Member of Blended Babies, producer ("Smoke Again")
Kiara Lanier — Singer, featured artist ("Good Ass Intro")
Lili K — Singer, featured artist ("Good Ass Intro," "Pusha Man")
Mike Kolar — Engineer, owner of Soundscape Studios, founder of Closed Sessions
Vic Mensa — Rapper, featured artist ("Cocoa Butter Kisses")
Cam O'bi – Producer ("Good Ass Intro," "Cocoa Butter Kisses," "Everything's Good [Good Ass Outro]")
Stefan Ponce – Producer ("Good Ass Intro")
Nico Segal – Trumpeter, member of the Social Experiment
Twista — Rapper, featured artist ("Cocoa Butter Kisses")
Austin Vesely – Director ("Juice," "Everybody's Something," "NaNa")

Charts

References

External links 
 Official Acid Rap download and stream

2013 mixtape albums
Albums produced by Jake One
Albums produced by J.U.S.T.I.C.E. League
Chance the Rapper albums